CCLC may refer to:
Coram Children's Legal Centre, UK charity
Crane Creek Lumber Company, former US railroad
Civil Code of Lower Canada, 1866 legal document
Children's Care and Learning Center of JCCMI Christian Academy, Daguan, Philippines
21st Century Community Learning Center, or 21stCCLC, US after-school program